Brigadier Edward Earnshaw Eden Cass   (3 March 1898 – 31 August 1968) was a senior British Army officer who served in the First World War and the Second World War. He was briefly acting General Officer Commanding the 3rd Infantry Division just after the Normandy landings.

Military career
Educated at the Royal Military College, Sandhurst, Cass was commissioned into the King's Own Yorkshire Light Infantry on 27 October 1916 during the First World War. He was awarded the Military Cross and the Distinguished Service Order for his actions on the Western Front. The citation for his MC reads:

Promoted to acting lieutenant-colonel, Cass became commanding officer of 1st Battalion The King's Own Yorkshire Light Infantry in April 1940 and was deployed to Norway in command of his regiment at an early stage of the Second World War. He went on to command the 11th Infantry Brigade in February 1942 and saw action in North Africa, Sicily and Italy. He then became commander of the 8th Infantry Brigade in October 1943 and, having been appointed a Commander of the Order of the British Empire on 23 March 1944, he went ashore with his brigade as part of the 3rd Infantry Division during the Normandy landings. After Major-General Tom Rennie was wounded in action, he briefly served as acting General Officer Commanding the 3rd Division from 13 to 23 June 1944. After that he became commander of 184th Infantry Brigade in February 1945 and then commander of 114th Infantry Brigade in June 1945. He left his command in August 1945 and retired in January 1949.

In retirement he became secretary of the National Rifle Association at the National Shooting Centre in Bisley.

Bibliography

References

External links
Generals of World War II

1898 births
1968 deaths
People from Ravenglass
Military personnel from Cumberland
King's Own Yorkshire Light Infantry officers
Commanders of the Order of the British Empire
Companions of the Distinguished Service Order
Recipients of the Military Cross
Graduates of the Royal Military College, Sandhurst
British Army personnel of World War I
British Army brigadiers of World War II